Apostolos Papadopoulos of George (1900 in Pteleos – 1983 in Thessaloniki) was a professor of theology, writer and preacher, with significant social action, who was awarded with the officium of teacher of the Great Church of Christ.

He was born in Pteleos, Magnesia in 1900. He was a son of the priest Georgios Papadopoulos, who built the church of St. Euthymios in Pigadi in Pteleos, and of his wife Eleni. Aftr 1907, when his father died, his mother raised him along with his five siblings, working as a practical midwife. He enrolled in the Theological Department of the University of Athens. He didn't manage to graduate, because his was conscripted during the years of 1920 – 1922, participating in the Greco-Turkish war, and was awarded the Cross of Valour. He returned to Athens and graduated in 1924. He was then appointed teacher of theology in various high schools, in Lafko, Sourpi, Sofades, Tsaritsani, Karditsa, Almyros an mainly Volos, where he settled after his marriage with Aspasia Tsaknaki in November 1935. During the Axis occupation of Greece he participated in distributing food, medicine, clothes and other help to those in need in Magnesia, as part of the Organisation of Christian Solidarity.

References 

1900 births
1983 deaths
People from Magnesia (regional unit)